Middle Creek is a  tributary of the Lackawaxen River in the Poconos of eastern Pennsylvania in the United States.

The confluence of Middle Creek and the Lackawaxen River at Hawley is located behind the Hawley Public Library.

History of the name:
The name Middle Creek is a shortened version of Middle Valley Creek, as the creek's headwaters originate in Middle Valley with the upper end being Varden.

See also
List of rivers of Pennsylvania

References

Rivers of Pennsylvania
Pocono Mountains
Tributaries of the Lackawaxen River
Rivers of Wayne County, Pennsylvania